Operation Vijay may refer to:
Operation Vijay (1961), the operation by the Military of India that led to the capture of Goa, Daman and Diu and Anjediva Islands
Operation Vijay (1999), the Indian operation to push back infiltrators in the Kargil War